Michael Green (born 7 November 1970) is a retired Jamaican sprinter who specialized in the 100 metres. Michael Green was born in Trelawny. He attended William Knibb Memorial High and graduated in May 1989 where he dominated the 100m. Green's nickname at William Knibb was 'Roach'. After graduating from William Knibb as the fastest male in 1989, Green was awarded a scholarship to attend Clemson University. Michael Green and 100m World Record setting sprinter Usain Bolt are former students at William Knibb Memorial High School.

His personal best time is 10.02 seconds, achieved in April 1997 in Knoxville, TN. With 6.49 over the 60 metres during the 1997 indoor season he was the world top performer that year, together with Ato Boldon and Randall Evans. Green still holds the fastest first 40m split ever recorded during a 100m race—albeit by just 0.01s—ahead of Usain Bolt's 9.58s world record performance at Berlin in 2009. Thus William Knibb High includes the two fastest 40m performers ever among its alumni.

International competitions

References
 

1970 births
Living people
People from Trelawny Parish
Jamaican male sprinters
Olympic athletes of Jamaica
Athletes (track and field) at the 1992 Summer Olympics
Athletes (track and field) at the 1996 Summer Olympics
World Athletics Indoor Championships medalists
Commonwealth Games silver medallists for Jamaica
Commonwealth Games medallists in athletics
Athletes (track and field) at the 1994 Commonwealth Games
Clemson Tigers men's track and field athletes
20th-century Jamaican people
21st-century Jamaican people
Medallists at the 1994 Commonwealth Games